The Japan Challenge Tour, currently titled as the AbemaTV Tour for sponsorships reasons, is a series of developmental golf tournaments run by the Japan Golf Tour Organization. It has been in operation since 1985. The 2018 schedule featured 12 tournaments, with prize funds of mostly ¥15 million. This is about a tenth of the level of prize money per event on offer on the main Japanese Tour, and the main tour also has a longer season.

In 2018, internet television provider AbemaTV became the tour's sponsor. It was also announced that the tour would be included into the Official World Golf Ranking starting in 2019, with the winner receiving a minimum of 4 points for a 54-hole event.

2023 season

Schedule
The following table lists official events during the 2023 season.

2022 season

Schedule
The following table lists official events during the 2022 season.

Money list
The money list was based on prize money won during the season, calculated in Japanese yen. The top 20 players on the tour earned status to play on the 2023 Japan Golf Tour.

2020–21 season

Schedule
The following table lists official events during the 2020–21 season.

Money list
The money list was based on prize money won during the season, calculated in Japanese yen. The top 20 players on the tour earned status to play on the 2022 Japan Golf Tour.

2019 season

Schedule
The following table lists official events during the 2019 season.

Money list
The money list was based on prize money won during the season, calculated in Japanese yen. The top 20 players on the tour earned status to play on the 2020–21 Japan Golf Tour.

2018 season

Schedule
The following table lists official events during the 2018 season.

Money list
The money list was based on prize money won during the season, calculated in Japanese yen. The top 20 players on the tour earned status to play on the 2019 Japan Golf Tour.

2017 season

Schedule
The following table lists official events during the 2017 season.

Money list
The money list was based on prize money won during the season, calculated in Japanese yen. The top 20 players on the tour earned status to play on the 2018 Japan Golf Tour.

2016 season

Schedule
The following table lists official events during the 2016 season.

Money list
The money list was based on prize money won during the season, calculated in Japanese yen. The top 20 players on the tour earned status to play on the 2017 Japan Golf Tour.

2015 season

Schedule
The following table lists official events during the 2015 season.

Money list
The money list was based on prize money won during the season, calculated in Japanese yen. The top 20 players on the tour earned status to play on the 2016 Japan Golf Tour.

2014 season

Schedule
The following table lists official events during the 2014 season.

Money list
The money list was based on prize money won during the season, calculated in Japanese yen. The top 20 players on the tour earned status to play on the 2015 Japan Golf Tour.

2013 season

Schedule
The following table lists official events during the 2013 season.

Money list
The money list was based on prize money won during the season, calculated in Japanese yen. The top 20 players on the tour earned status to play on the 2014 Japan Golf Tour.

2012 season

Schedule
The following table lists official events during the 2012 season.

Money list
The money list was based on prize money won during the season, calculated in Japanese yen. The top 20 players on the tour earned status to play on the 2013 Japan Golf Tour.

2011 season

Schedule
The following table lists official events during the 2011 season.

Money list
The money list was based on prize money won during the season, calculated in Japanese yen. The top 20 players on the tour earned status to play on the 2012 Japan Golf Tour.

2010 season

Schedule
The following table lists official events during the 2010 season.

Money list
The money list was based on prize money won during the season, calculated in Japanese yen. The top 20 players on the tour earned status to play on the 2011 Japan Golf Tour.

2009 season

Schedule
The following table lists official events during the 2009 season.

Money list
The money list was based on prize money won during the season, calculated in Japanese yen. The top 20 players on the tour earned status to play on the 2010 Japan Golf Tour.

2008 season

Schedule
The following table lists official events during the 2008 season.

Money list
The money list was based on prize money won during the season, calculated in Japanese yen. The top 20 players on the tour earned status to play on the 2009 Japan Golf Tour.

2007 season

Schedule
The following table lists official events during the 2007 season.

Money list
The money list was based on prize money won during the season, calculated in Japanese yen. The top 20 players on the tour earned status to play on the 2008 Japan Golf Tour.

2006 season

Schedule
The following table lists official events during the 2006 season.

Money list
The money list was based on prize money won during the season, calculated in Japanese yen. The top 20 players on the tour earned status to play on the 2007 Japan Golf Tour.

2005 season

Schedule
The following table lists official events during the 2005 season.

Money list
The money list was based on prize money won during the season, calculated in Japanese yen. The top 20 players on the tour earned status to play on the 2006 Japan Golf Tour.

2004 season

Schedule
The following table lists official events during the 2004 season.

Money list
The money list was based on prize money won during the season, calculated in Japanese yen. The top 20 players on the tour earned status to play on the 2005 Japan Golf Tour.

2003 season

Schedule
The following table lists official events during the 2003 season.

Money list
The money list was based on prize money won during the season, calculated in Japanese yen. The top 20 players on the tour earned status to play on the 2004 Japan Golf Tour.

2002 season

Schedule
The following table lists official events during the 2002 season.

Money list
The money list was based on prize money won during the season, calculated in Japanese yen. The top 20 players on the tour earned status to play on the 2003 Japan Golf Tour.

2001 season

Schedule
The following table lists official events during the 2001 season.

Money list
The money list was based on prize money won during the season, calculated in Japanese yen. The top 20 players on the tour earned status to play on the 2002 Japan Golf Tour.

2000 season

Schedule
The following table lists official events during the 2000 season.

Money list
The money list was based on prize money won during the season, calculated in Japanese yen. The top 20 players on the tour earned status to play on the 2001 Japan Golf Tour.

1999 season

Schedule
The following table lists official events during the 1999 season.

Money list
The money list was based on prize money won during the season, calculated in Japanese yen. The top 20 players on the tour earned status to play on the 2000 Japan Golf Tour.

1998 season

Schedule
The following table lists official events during the 1998 season.

1997 season

Schedule
The following table lists official events during the 1997 season.

1996 season

Schedule
The following table lists official events during the 1996 season.

1995 season

Schedule
The following table lists official events during the 1995 season.

1994 season

Schedule
The following table lists official events during the 1994 season.

1993 season

Schedule
The following table lists official events during the 1993 season.

1992 season

Schedule
The following table lists official events during the 1992 season.

1991 season

Schedule
The following table lists official events during the 1991 season.

1990 season

Schedule
The following table lists official events during the 1990 season.

1989 season

Schedule
The following table lists official events during the 1989 season.

1988 season

Schedule
The following table lists official events during the 1988 season.

1987 season

Schedule
The following table lists official events during the 1987 season.

1986 season

Schedule
The following table lists official events during the 1986 season.

1985 season

Schedule
The following table lists official events during the 1985 season.

Money list winners

Notes

References

External links
Current season schedule on the Japan Golf Tour's official site

 
Professional golf tours